The women's 800 metres event  at the 1989 IAAF World Indoor Championships was held at the Budapest Sportcsarnok in Budapest on March 4 and 5.

Medalists

Results

Heats
First 2 of each heat (Q) and next 2 fastest (q) qualified for the final.

Final

References

800
800 metres at the World Athletics Indoor Championships